Jorge "Potro" Carlos Alberto Domínguez (born 7 March 1959) is an Argentinian former professional footballer who played as a striker.

Born in Buenos Aires, Domínguez started his career in 1978 with Boca Juniors where he played in one game against Unión de Santa Fe. He then joined Club de Gimnasia y Esgrima La Plata where he played until his return to Boca Juniors in 1983.

In 1984, he moved to France where he played for Nice, Toulon, Nîmes and Tours. In 1991, he returned to Argentina to play for Mandiyú. His final club was Laferrere of the Argentine second division.

References

Profile at historiadeboca

External links
 

1959 births
Living people
Footballers from Buenos Aires
Argentine footballers
Association football forwards
Argentina international footballers
Argentine Primera División players
Boca Juniors footballers
Club de Gimnasia y Esgrima La Plata footballers
Textil Mandiyú footballers
OGC Nice players
SC Toulon players
Nîmes Olympique players
Tours FC players
Ligue 1 players
Ligue 2 players
Argentine expatriate footballers
Argentine expatriate sportspeople in France
Expatriate footballers in France